Arch Enemy is a Swedish melodic death metal band, originally a supergroup from Halmstad, formed in 1995. Its members were in bands such as Carcass, Armageddon, Carnage, Mercyful Fate, Spiritual Beggars, The Agonist, Nevermore, and Eucharist. It was founded by Carcass guitarist Michael Amott along with Johan Liiva, who were both originally from the death metal band Carnage. The band has released eleven studio albums, three live albums, three video albums and four EPs. The band was originally fronted by Johan Liiva, who was replaced by German vocalist Angela Gossow in 2000. Gossow left the band in March 2014 to become the group's manager and was replaced by Canadian vocalist Alissa White-Gluz.

History

Early years and Black Earth (1995–1997)
Arch Enemy's debut album was Black Earth, was recorded in Studio Fredman and released by the now defunct Wrong Again Records in 1996.

Stigmata, Burning Bridges, and Gossow (1998–2000)

After the release of Black Earth the band switched labels, signing a contract with Century Media. In 1998 Arch Enemy released Stigmata, for which bassist Martin Bengtsson and drummer Peter Wildoer joined the band. The album gained a wider audience and popularity in Europe and America. This was also the first Arch Enemy album to be released worldwide.

In 1999, Sharlee D'Angelo (ex-King Diamond, ex-Mercyful Fate) assumed the role of Arch Enemy's bassist, and Daniel Erlandsson (Eucharist, ex-Carcass) was again recruited as the drummer. Burning Bridges was released, and was followed by the live album Burning Japan Live 1999. During the touring-cycle for Burning Bridges, D'Angelo was temporarily replaced twice; first by Dick Lövgren (Meshuggah, ex-Armageddon) and then by Roger Nilsson (ex-Spiritual Beggars, Firebird, the Quill).

In November 2000, vocalist Johan Liiva left and was replaced by German death metal vocalist Angela Gossow.

Wages of Sin and Anthems of Rebellion (2001–2004)
The first album with songs featuring Gossow was Wages of Sin, released in 2001. In December of the same year, Arch Enemy took part in the "Japan's Beast Feast 2002" concert, playing alongside Slayer and Motörhead.

Anthems of Rebellion was released in 2003 and brought some innovations, such as the use of a second voice singing in harmony; such as in the "End of the Line" and "Dehumanization" tracks. In November of the following year, the band released the EP Dead Eyes See No Future, which featured live recordings, along with covers of Manowar, Megadeth and Carcass songs. In June 2004, the band embarked upon yet another Japan tour.

Doomsday Machine (2005–2006)
In June 2005, Arch Enemy finished the recording for their sixth album, Doomsday Machine. In July 2005, guitarist Christopher Amott left the band in order to focus on his personal life. He was temporarily replaced by guitarist Gus G. (Ozzy Osbourne, Firewind) and then by Fredrik Åkesson in September 2005. Christopher returned on a permanent basis in March 2007, shortly before the band entered the studio to begin recording their new album with producer Fredrik Nordström (who had previously worked with the band on their first four albums). Åkesson went on to become Opeth's new lead guitarist in May 2007.

Rise of the Tyrant (2007–2008)

Arch Enemy's seventh album, entitled Rise of the Tyrant was released on 24 September 2007 in Europe and 25 September 2007 in the United States. Rise of the Tyrant debuted at number 84 on the Billboard 200 chart. This surpassed the Doomsday Machine chart entry, making it the band's highest charting effort to date. Gossow said the new album has more emotion and less double vocals, as well as less vocal processing, yielding a more "raw" presentation.

Arch Enemy played the Bloodstock Open Air Festival in August 2007, between Sabbat and In Flames. They then performed on the Black Crusade tour at the end of 2007 with Machine Head, Trivium, DragonForce and Shadows Fall.

On 8 March 2008 Arch Enemy filmed a live show in Tokyo, Japan for the live DVD Tyrants of the Rising Sun. Arch Enemy also co-headlined the "Defenders of the Faith" tour in April 2008 with Opeth, while DevilDriver and 3 Inches of Blood opened for them. They then headlined the "Tyranny and Bloodshred" tour in May 2008 with Dark Tranquillity, Divine Heresy, and Firewind as supporting acts.

The Root of All Evil (2009–2010)
A compilation album titled The Root of All Evil was released on 28 September 2009 in Europe, 30 September in Japan, and 6 October in the United States. The Root of All Evil features twelve re-recorded songs spanning the band's career before Gossow joined as vocalist, with some material pre-dating D'Angelo as their bassist. In the first half of 2009, the band toured Europe and South America, and then played at the annual "Dubai Desert Rock Festival" alongside Opeth, Chimaira, and Motörhead. Following the release of The Root of All Evil on 28 September 2009, the band embarked on an Asian and Australian tour, which included their first visit to New Zealand. The tour started at the "Loud Park festival" in Japan on 17 October supplementing other acts including Megadeth, Judas Priest, Slayer, Anthrax, Rob Zombie and Children of Bodom. They also toured in South Korea on 25 October headlining at the Melon AX Hall in Seoul.

Khaos Legions and Christopher's second departure (2011–2013)

According to a September 2010 interview with Angela Gossow, Arch Enemy entered the studio on 1 December to begin recording their eighth album, Khaos Legions, for a release in June 2011, according to the band's website. The first single from the album was released on the Century Media website on 31 March entitled "Yesterday is Dead and Gone". The album was released on 31 May 2011. On 12 December the band announced that they would be filming a show in Cologne the following day for an upcoming live DVD entitled "World Khaos Tour".

On 3 March 2012 it was announced on the band's Facebook page that Christopher Amott had once again departed from the band. He was replaced by Nick Cordle from Arsis. Arch Enemy released their third music video from Khaos Legions on 25 April 2012 for "Under Black Flags We March". Not only does Nick Cordle appear in the video, he also recorded a new guitar solo, making this his debut track with the band.

Gossow's departure and War Eternal (2014−2015)
On 3 March 2014 the band revealed their ninth album would be titled War Eternal, released in June 2014.

On 17 March 2014, Gossow released a statement announcing her departure from the group and welcoming her replacement, former vocalist of Canadian metalcore band the Agonist, Alissa White-Gluz. In the statement, she wrote that while she had enjoyed her time with the group, it was time for her to move on, be with her family and pursue other interests. Gossow did confirm that she would remain Arch Enemy's business manager, and would be "passing the torch to the super talented Alissa White-Gluz, whom I’ve known as a dear friend and a superb vocalist for many years. I always thought she deserved a chance to shine – and now she’s getting it. Just like I got that chance back in 2001."

White-Gluz also released a statement saying: "I am very honored and happy to announce a new chapter in my life and musical career. Wages of Sin was the first metal album I ever bought, and it was love at first listen. It is not often that you get a phone call from your favorite band asking you to join! I am thrilled to have the opportunity to work with such amazingly talented musicians whom I also consider great friends. I look forward to being able to write and perform at a whole new level now with Arch Enemy! Music is forever, metal is limitless and this is only the beginning!"

During Arch Enemy's North American tour in support of their album War Eternal, guitarist Nick Cordle left the band on 10 November 2014. Specifically, he left the stage with only a few songs remaining in the set during the show at San Francisco's Regency Ballroom. Christopher Amott temporarily re-joined the band for the remainder of the tour, while famed guitarist Jeff Loomis (formerly of Nevermore) was announced as the official replacement and joined the band for their European tour with Kreator and subsequent events.

New project Black Earth (2016–2017) 
On 22 January 2016, the founding members of Arch Enemy formed a side project named Black Earth. Consisting of former members Liiva and Christopher Amott, and current members Daniel Erlandsson, Michael Amott, and Sharlee D'Angelo, the band played a sold out Japan tour in May 2016 to celebrate the 20th anniversary of both Arch Enemy and the release of their debut album, Black Earth, they only performed songs from the band's first three albums.

Will to Power (2017–2019) 
On 26 August 2016, it was announced that Arch Enemy was working on their tenth studio album which would be released in 2017. On 22 May 2017, the band revealed that the album would be entitled Will to Power, to be released on 8 September 2017 by Century Media Records. 

The first single, "The World Is Yours", was released on 14 July 2017, along with a music video that gained more than 1.1 million views on YouTube in the first two days. 

On 2 August 2017, the band announced a co-headlining North American tour with Trivium in fall 2017 with While She Sleeps and Fit for an Autopsy as support acts.

In an October 2018 interview, Michael Amott announced that he has been "writing a little bit here and there" and has "a few new ideas" for the next Arch Enemy album.

Covered in Blood (2019) 
On 18 January 2019, Arch Enemy released "Covered in Blood", a compilation album of songs covered over the years.

European tour and Deceivers (2020–present) 
On 30 November 2020, Arch Enemy announced their participation in the European Siege Tour 2021 with Behemoth, Carcass and Unto Others (later postponed to 2022). On 21 October 2021, Arch Enemy premiered the music video for their new single "Deceiver, Deceiver". On 10 December 2021, they released a music video for another single, "House of Mirrors". On 27 January 2022, Arch Enemy announced their eleventh album, entitled Deceivers, released on 12 August 2022 (originally announced for 29 July 2022, but later postponed). Along with the album announcement came the third single "Handshake with Hell", with yet another music video. The song was listed as Loudwire's "best metal/rock song" of 2022, after "We'll Be Back" by Megadeth. On 22 April 2022, the band announced the fourth single from the new album, "Sunset over the Empire", released on 20 May 2022, digitally and as a limited 7" vinyl with a B-side "The Judging Eyes", an instrumental remake of "You Will Know My Name" from 2014’s "War Eternal". On 11 July 2022, came the fifth single announcement - "In the Eye of the Storm", out on 14 July 2022.

Musical style
Arch Enemy's musical style has been classified as melodic death metal. AllMusic critic Steve Huey describes the band's sound as a "blend [of] progressive and death metal influences." Earlier albums, such as Burning Bridges, while still classified as melodic death metal, are more centered around classic death metal.

Band members

Current members
 Michael Amott − guitar, backing vocals (1995–present), bass (1995–1997, 1998)
 Daniel Erlandsson − drums (1995–1997, 1998–present)
 Sharlee D'Angelo − bass (1998–present)
 Alissa White-Gluz − lead vocals (2014–present)
 Jeff Loomis − guitar, backing vocals (2014–present)

Former members
 Martin Bengtsson − bass (1997–1998)
 Peter Wildoer − drums (1997–1998)
 Johan Liiva − lead vocals (1995−2000, guest 2015)
 Fredrik Åkesson − guitar, backing vocals (2005–2007)
 Christopher Amott − guitar, backing vocals (1995–2005, 2007–2012, touring member 2014, guest 2015, 2016)
 Angela Gossow − lead vocals (2000–2014)
 Nick Cordle − guitar, backing vocals (2012–2014)

Timeline

Discography

 Black Earth (1996)
 Stigmata (1998)
 Burning Bridges (1999)
 Wages of Sin (2001)
 Anthems of Rebellion (2003)
 Doomsday Machine (2005)
 Rise of the Tyrant (2007)
 Khaos Legions (2011)
 War Eternal (2014)
 Will to Power (2017)
 Deceivers (2022)

References

External links

 Official website
Arch Enemy Discography

1996 establishments in Sweden
Articles which contain graphical timelines
Century Media Records artists
Musical quintets
Musical groups established in 1996
Swedish melodic death metal musical groups
Swedish heavy metal musical groups
Female-fronted musical groups